Albert Edward Anderson (September 22, 1885 – 1966) was an American lawyer and politician from Maine. Anderson, a Republican, represented Portland in the Maine House of Representatives from 19171918. He was an alternate to the 1948 Republican National Convention.

He served in the U.S. Army during World War I and was a graduate (class of 1909) from the University of Maine, which awards a scholarship in his name each year "to worthy students of Scandinavian descent."

References

1885 births
1966 deaths
Maine lawyers
Politicians from Portland, Maine
University of Maine alumni
Republican Party members of the Maine House of Representatives
20th-century American politicians
20th-century American lawyers